Mallosia tristis is a species of beetle in the family Cerambycidae, that can be found in Azerbaijan, Iran and Turkey.

References

Saperdini
Beetles described in 1888
Beetles of Asia